Orophea submaculata is a species of plant in the Annonaceae family. It is endemic to the Philippines.  It is threatened by habitat loss.

References

Flora of the Philippines
submaculata
Vulnerable plants
Taxonomy articles created by Polbot